DEL Records is an American Spanish language record label founded by Angel Del Villar in 2009. It's headquarters is in Anaheim, California and includes DEL Records, DEL Publishing, DEL Studios and DEL Entertainment, all of which focus on Regional Mexican music, specifically with genres from Mexico's pacific states such as Banda, Pacific-style Norteño, Norteño-Banda, Sierreño, Sierreño-Banda and Mariachi. DEL Records has launched the careers of chart-topping artists like Gerardo Ortíz, Luis Coronel, Ulices Chaidez y Sus Plebes, and Régulo Caro. DEL Records and its artists are frequent winners at the Billboard Latin Music Awards including five in 2017. In seven years, DEL's sales, touring and content development divisions lead and transform the genre. DEL boasts 3 platinum and 9 gold records, and more than 10 #1 singles, as well as #1 albums. DEL Records’ artist tours every week of the year, with over 200 live concert dates in the US and Mexico.

History
The label was formed by Angel who previously ran a fencing company. The label's first signing was with Gerardo Ortíz in 2010. Originally, DEL Records had a partnership with Anaheim, California based VIP Music. The label is currently distributed Independently by DEL Records

In April 2015, DEL Records donated $12,200 to the Rowland Unified School District in Rowland Heights, California in order to help with their area student and teacher scholarships.

In 2016, DEL Records received six Billboard Latin Music Awards including those for Regional Mexican Airplay Label of the Year, Regional Mexican Airplay Imprint of the Year and Regional Mexican Albums Imprint of the Year.

On April 14, 2016, the label entered into a partnership with Combate Americas, the first-ever U.S. Hispanic Mixed Martial Arts sports franchise. The premier event was April 18, 2016 for NBC Universo's fight series, Road to the Championship. Regulo Caro and King Lil G walked the MMA fighters to the cage and also performed later in the night. Also in 2016, DEL Records partnered with local and national organizations to launch "Shut Up the Haters and Vote," which encouraged high school students of eligible age to register to vote.

Two years after the death of their artist Ariel Camacho, DEL Records released on February 24, 2017 a tribute album of duets with other artists on the label such as Gerardo Ortiz, Luis Coronel and Regulo Caro. Ariel Camacho Para Siempre Duetos, Vol.1 includes a 15-minute DVD of unreleased footage of Camacho. Los Plebes del Rancho de Ariel Camacho, the group formed after the singer's death from his band, received eight 2017 Billboard Latin Music Award nominations, and won three of them.

DEL Records received five Billboard Latin Music Awards in 2017, among them Top Latin Albums Artist of the Year, Duo or Group and Regional Mexican Songs Artist of the Year Erick Hernandez.

List of current artists on DEL Records
A.B. Quintanilla III y Elektro Kumbia
Banda Culiacancito
Cheli Madrid
Escolta de Guerra
Gabriel Díaz/Diego and Gabriel
Grupo Cartel
Grupo Fernández
Jaziel Avilez
Lenin Ramírez
Los del Arroyo
Los del Limit
Los Migueles
Los Nuevos Rebeldes
Oscar Cortez
"El Rafa" Mendez- Writer
Raul Lizárraga
Revolver Cannabis
Los Traviezos de la Zierra
Ulices Chaidez y Sus Plebes
T3R Elemento
Jose Manuel López Castro
Eslabon Armado
Supremo
Gabino Montalvo
El Makabelico

List of former artists
Ariel Camacho y los Plebes del Rancho (20142016)
Gerardo Ortíz
Luis Coronel (20122017)
Régulo Caro
Los de Leal
Abraham Vázquez
King Lil G

Awards

Discography

References

External links
 Official website
Twitter
Instagram
Facebook
Soundcloud
Discogs

Record labels based in California
Latin American music record labels
Record labels established in 2008
Spanish record labels
Mexican music